Al-Ghadhriya Sport Club, is an Iraqi football team based in Karbalaa, that plays in Iraq Division Two.

Managerial history
 Maitham Da’i al-Haq
 Khaled Waleed

See also
 2016–17 Iraq FA Cup
 2020–21 Iraq FA Cup
 2021–22 Iraq FA Cup

References

External links
 Al-Ghadhriya SC on Goalzz.com
 Iraq Clubs- Foundation Dates

1975 establishments in Iraq
Association football clubs established in 1975
Football clubs in Karbala
Karbala